Museum of Ceramics or Ceramics Museum or Museu de Cerâmica may refer to any of numerous museums listed at Ceramics museum or to particular museums named Ceramics Museum or Museum of Ceramics:

(by country)
Museu de Cerâmica (Caldas da Rainha), in Portugal
Museu de Cerâmica, within the Museu de les Arts Aplicades, Barcelona, in Spain
Museum of Ceramics (East Liverpool, Ohio), USA